Indradhanush is an Indian children's television series.

Indradhanush may also refer to:
Indradhanush (Air Force Exercise), by the Royal Air Force and the Indian Air Force
Indradhanush (film), a 2000 Indian Kannada-language action drama
Indradhanush (magazine), a monthly Indian children's magazine
Mission Indradhanush, a vaccination programme